Miracle Child is a 1993 American made-for-television drama film based on the novel Miracle at Clement's Pond by Patricia Pendergraft. It was filmed in Archer, Florida and featured historic homes and churches in and around Archer.  It was produced by Steve White Productions. It is part of the Disney Family Classics line.

Plot
A despairing young widow (Crystal Bernard) who abandons her baby at pond-side among bulrushes and a traveling man (John Terry) who's fighting to reclaim his own son (Graham Sack) are drawn together. A baby plops out of a rainy, stormy sky into the arms of the town's beloved, vaguely addled spinster (Grace Zabriskie). Miracles suddenly reverse the fortunes of the town as drought and unemployment disappear, only to be replaced by boosterism and greed.

Cast
 Crystal Bernard as Lisa Porter
 Cloris Leachman as Doc Betty
 John Terry as Buck Sanders
 Graham Sack as Lyle Sanders
 Grace Zabriskie as Adeleine Newberry
 George D. Wallace as Grandpa
 Lexi Randall as Taffy Marshall
 Gary Grubbs as John Marshall
 Barnard Hughes as Judge
 Bekka Allen as Willa Mrshall
 Rick Galloway as English
 Ryk O. aka Dick Ochampaugh as Cueball
 Thomas C. Chapman as Old Jack
 John Archie as Sherriff Peak (sic)
 Brett Cipes as The Whittler
 Rocky Essex as Painter

External links

References

1993 television films
1993 films
1993 drama films
Disney television films
Films based on American novels
NBC network original films
Films directed by Michael Pressman
Films scored by Craig Safan
American drama television films
1990s American films